Tuoba pallida is a species of centipede in the Geophilidae family. It is endemic to Australia, and was first described in 1998 by R.E. Jones.

Description
This species is white throughout and can reach up to 25 mm in length. Males of this species have 55 pairs of legs; females have 57 or 59 leg pairs.

Distribution
The species occurs in coastal south-west Western Australia. The type locality is Penguin Island, Rockingham, Perth.

Behaviour
The centipedes are solitary terrestrial predators that inhabit plant litter and soil.

References

 

 
pallida
Centipedes of Australia
Endemic fauna of Australia
Fauna of Western Australia
Animals described in 1998